Gribbin is a surname of Irish origin. Notable people with the surname include:

Basil Gribbin, Australian judge
Ciaran Gribbin (born 1976), Northern Ireland musician
Deirdre Gribbin (born 1967), Northern Ireland classical composer
John Gribbin (born 1946), British science writer and astrophysicist
Vincent Gribbin (born 1965), English rugby league player

References

Surnames of Irish origin